Montceaux-lès-Meaux (literally Montceaux near Meaux) is a commune in the Seine-et-Marne department in the Île-de-France region in north-central France.

Château 
The town is known for the former Château de Montceaux, which Henri II gave to Catherine de' Medici in 1556. Only vestiges remain.

Demographics
Inhabitants are called Monticellois.

See also
Communes of the Seine-et-Marne department

References

External links

1999 Land Use, from IAURIF (Institute for Urban Planning and Development of the Paris-Île-de-France région) 

Communes of Seine-et-Marne